Pesenti is an Italian surname. Notable people with the surname include:

Antonio Pesenti (cyclist) (1908–1968), Italian cyclist
Guglielmo Pesenti (1933–2002), Italian cyclist
Massimiliano Pesenti (born 1987), Italian footballer
Michele Pesenti ( 1470–after 1524), Italian composer and lutenist

See also
Alessandro Pesenti-Rossi (born 1942), Italian racing driver

Italian-language surnames